William Percy Rogers  (23 November 1914 – 28 April 1997) was an Australian zoologist known for his work in parasitology. He was Professor of Parasitology at the Waite Agricultural Research Institute 1966–1979.

References

Fellows of the Australian Academy of Science
1914 births
1997 deaths
20th-century Australian zoologists
Academic staff of the University of Adelaide